Richard Timothy Kinney (December 15, 1916 in Utah – March 24, 1985 in Glendale, California) was an American animator and comic book writer.  His comic book work was mostly in Disney comics, writing stories featuring Donald Duck and Scrooge McDuck. He was the writer who, along with artist Al Hubbard, created Fethry Duck and Hard Haid Moe.  Kinney is the younger brother of fellow Disney animator Jack Kinney.

Earlier, as an animation writer, Kinney was part of the story crew on various Disney, Walter Lantz Productions, UPA and Jack Kinney Productions/King Features Syndicate theatrical and TV cartoons. The Lantz cartoon Niagara Fools, featuring Woody Woodpecker, represented perhaps Kinney's most fondly-remembered original storyline. Later, Kinney would remake the story for comics with Fethry Duck in, essentially, the Woody role.

External links

1916 births
1985 deaths
Animators from Utah
American screenwriters
Animation screenwriters
Walt Disney Animation Studios people
Hanna-Barbera people
Disney comics writers
Walter Lantz Productions people
20th-century American screenwriters